Make Love, Not War: The Sexual Revolution: An Unfettered History is a 2001 book by David Allyn.

Summary
Allyn documents the history of sexual revolution that took place in the United States in the 1960s. The name references the popular 1960s counterculture anti-war slogan "Make love, not war".

References

2001 non-fiction books
Sexuality in the United States